The Turkish Armed Forces (TAF; , TSK) are the military forces of the Republic of Turkey. The Turkish Armed Forces consist of the General Staff, the Land Forces, the Naval Forces and the Air Forces. The current Chief of the General Staff is General Yaşar Güler. The Chief of the General Staff is the Commander of the Armed Forces. In wartime, the Chief of the General Staff acts as the Commander-in-Chief on behalf of the President, who represents the Supreme Military Command of the TAF on behalf of the Grand National Assembly of Turkey. Coordinating the military relations of the TAF with other NATO member states and friendly states is the responsibility of the General Staff.

The history of the Turkish Armed Forces began with its formation after the collapse of the Ottoman Empire. The Turkish military has traditionally perceived itself as the guardian of Kemalism, the official state ideology, especially of its emphasis on secularism, and has carried out two coups. From its first years, it has been involved in suppressing Kurdish rebellions, including the ongoing Kurdish–Turkish conflict (1978–present).

After becoming a member of NATO in 1952, Turkey initiated a comprehensive modernization program for its armed forces, and was involved in the Korean War alongside South Korea and NATO. Towards the end of the 1980s, a second restructuring process was initiated. The Turkish Armed Forces participate in an EU Battlegroup under the control of the European Council, the Italian-Romanian-Turkish Battlegroup. The TAF also contributes operational staff to the Eurocorps multinational army corps initiative of the EU and NATO. It is currently involved in the Syrian Civil War and the Cyprus dispute.

The Turkish Armed Forces is the second largest standing military force in NATO, after the U.S. Armed Forces, and the thirteenth in the world, with an estimated strength of 775,000 military and paramilitary personnel in 2022. Turkey is one of five NATO member states which are part of the nuclear sharing policy of the alliance, together with Belgium, Germany, Italy, and the Netherlands. A total of 50 U.S. B61 nuclear bombs are hosted at the Incirlik Air Base, the most of the five countries.

History

War of Independence

After the end of World War I, following the occupation of Anatolia by Entente Powers, many Ottoman military personnel escaped from Rumelia to Anatolia in order to join the new Turkish National Movement (TNM). During the War of Independence, on 3 May 1920, Birinci Ferik Mustafa Fevzi Pasha (Çakmak) was appointed the Minister of National Defence, and Mirliva İsmet Pasha (İnönü) was appointed the Minister of the Chief of General Staff of the government of the Grand National Assembly (GNA). But on 3 August 1921, the GNA fired İsmet Pasha from the post of Minister of National Defence because of his failure at the Battle of Afyonkarahisar–Eskişehir and on 5 August, just before the Battle of Sakarya, appointed the chairman of the GNA Mustafa Kemal Pasha (Atatürk) as commander-in-chief of the Army of the GNA. The TNM won the War of Independence after İzmir was retrieved in 1922 as a result of Greco-Turkish Wars (1919–1922).

First Kurdish rebellions

There were several rebellions southeastern Turkey in the 1920s and 1930s, the most important of which were the 1925 Sheikh Said rebellion and the 1937 Dersim rebellion. All were suppressed by the TAF, sometimes involving large-scale mobilisations of up to 50,000 troops.

World War II 

Turkey remained neutral until the final stages of World War II. In the initial stage of World War II, Turkey signed a treaty of mutual assistance with Great Britain and France. But after the fall of France, the Turkish government tried to maintain an equal distance with both the Allies and the Axis. Following Nazi Germany's occupation of the Balkans, upon which the Axis-controlled territory in Thrace and the eastern islands of the Aegean Sea bordered Turkey, the Turkish government signed a Treaty of Friendship and Non-Aggression with Germany on 18 June 1941.

After the German invasion of the Soviet Union, the Turkish government sent a military delegation of observers under Lieutenant General Ali Fuat Erden to Germany and the Eastern Front. Following the German retreat from the Caucasus, the Turkish government then moved closer to the Allies and Winston Churchill secretly met with İsmet İnönü at the Adana Conference in Yenice Train Station in southern Turkey on 30 January 1943, with the intent of persuading Turkey to join the war on the side of the Allies. A few days before the start of Operation Zitadelle in July 1943, the Turkish government sent a military delegation under General Cemil Cahit Toydemir to Russia and observed the exercises of the 503rd Heavy Panzer Battalion and its equipment. But after the failure of Operation Zitadelle, the Turkish government participated in the Second Cairo Conference in December 1943, where Franklin D. Roosevelt, Churchill and İnönü reached an agreement on issues regarding Turkey's possible contribution to the Allies. On 23 February 1945, Turkey joined the Allies by declaring war against Germany and Japan, after it was announced at the Yalta Conference that only the states which were formally at war with Germany and Japan by 1 March 1945 would be admitted to the United Nations.

Korean War

Turkey participated in the Korean War as a member state of the United Nations and sent the Turkish Brigade, which suffered 731 losses in combat, to South Korea. On 18 February 1952, Turkey became a member of NATO. The South Korean government donated a war memorial for the Turkish soldiers who fought and died in Korea. The Korean pagoda is in Ankara and it was donated in 1973 for the 50th anniversary of the Turkish Republic.

Invasion in Cyprus

On 20 July 1974, the TAF launched an amphibious and airborne assault operation on Cyprus, in response to the 1974 Cypriot coup d'état which had been staged by EOKA-B and the Cypriot National Guard against president Makarios III with the intention of annexing the island to Greece; but the military intervention ended up with Turkey occupying a considerable area on the northern part of Cyprus and helping to establish a local government of Turkish Cypriots there, which has thus far been recognized only by Turkey. The intervention came after more than a decade of intercommunal violence (1963–1974) between the island's Greek Cypriots and Turkish Cypriots, resulting from the constitutional breakdown of 1963. Turkey invoked its role as a guarantor under the Treaty of Guarantee in justification for the military intervention. Turkish forces landed on the island in two waves, invading and occupying 37% of the island's territory in the northeast for the Turkish Cypriots, who had been isolated in small enclaves across the island prior to the military intervention.

In the aftermath, the Turkish Cypriots declared a separate political entity in the form of the Turkish Federated State of Cyprus in 1975; and in 1983 made a unilateral declaration of independence as the Turkish Republic of Northern Cyprus, which is recognized only by Turkey to this day. The United Nations continues to recognize the sovereignty of the Republic of Cyprus according to the terms of its independence in 1960. The conflict continues to overshadow Turkish relations with Greece and with the European Union. In 2004, during the referendum for the Annan Plan for Cyprus (a United Nations proposal to resolve the Cyprus dispute) 76% of the Greek Cypriots rejected the proposal, while 65% of the Turkish Cypriots accepted it.

Kurdish–Turkish conflict 

The TAF are in a protracted campaign against the PKK (recognized as a terrorist organization by the United States, the European Union and NATO) which has involved frequent forays into neighbouring Iraq and Syria. Abdullah Öcalan, the leader of the PKK was arrested in 1999 in Nairobi and taken to Turkey. In 2015, the PKK cancelled their 2013 ceasefire after tension due to various events.

War in Bosnia and Kosovo

Turkey contributed troops in several NATO-led peace forces in Bosnia and Kosovo. Currently there are 402 Turkish troops in Kosovo Force.

War in Afghanistan

After the 2003 Istanbul Bombings were linked to Al-Qaeda, Turkey deployed troops to Afghanistan to fight Taliban forces and Al-Qaeda operatives, with the hopes of dismantling both groups. Turkey's responsibilities include providing security in Kabul (it formerly lead Regional Command Capital), as well as in Wardak Province, where it leads PRT Maidan Shahr. Turkey was once the third largest contingent within the International Security Assistance Force. Turkey's troops are not engaged in combat operations and Ankara has long resisted pressure from Washington to offer more combat troops. According to the Washington Post, in December 2009, after US President Barack Obama announced he would deploy 30,000 more U.S. soldiers, and that Washington wants others to follow suit, Turkish Prime Minister Recep Tayyip Erdoğan reacted with the message that Turkey would not contribute additional troops to Afghanistan. "Turkey has already done what it can do by boosting its contingent of soldiers there to 1,750 from around 700 without being asked", said Erdoğan, who stressed that Turkey would continue its training of Afghan security forces.

Turkey withdrew their troops from Afghanistan after the fall of Kabul (2021).

Humanitarian relief
The TAF have performed "Disaster Relief Operations," as in the 1999 İzmit earthquake in the Marmara Region of Turkey. Apart from contributing to NATO, the Turkish Navy also contributes to the Black Sea Naval Co-operation Task Group, which was created in early 2001 by Turkey, Bulgaria, Georgia, Romania, Russia and Ukraine for search and rescue and other humanitarian operations in the Black Sea.

Today
According to the International Institute for Strategic Studies (IISS), in 2020 the Turkish Armed Forces had an active strength of around 355,200 active personnel consisting of 260,200 armed forces, 45,000 naval forces, and 50,000 air forces. In addition, it was estimated that there were 378,700 reserve personnel and 156,800 paramilitary personnel (Turkish Gendarmerie and Turkish Coast Guard), giving a combined active and reserve strength of around 890,500 personnel. In 2020, the defence budget amounted to 76.3 billion liras. The Law on the Court of Accounts was supposed to initiate external ex-post audits of armed forces' expenditure and pave the way for audits of extra budgetary resources earmarked for the defence sector, including the Defence Industry Support Fund. However, the Ministry of Defense has not provided the necessary information, so the armed forces expenditure is not being properly checked.

In 1998, Turkey announced a programme of modernisation worth US$160 billion over a twenty-year period in various projects including tanks, fighter jets, helicopters, submarines, warships and assault rifles. Turkey is a Level 3 contributor to the Joint Strike Fighter (JSF) programme. The final goal of Turkey is to produce new-generation indigenous military equipment and to become increasingly self-sufficient in terms of military technologies.

HAVELSAN of Turkey and Boeing of the United States are in the process of developing a next-generation, high-altitude ballistic missile defence shield. Turkey has chosen the Chinese defense firm CPMIEC to co-produce a $4 billion long-range air and missile system.

General staff 

Chief of the General Staff reports to Minister of National Defence. General staff is responsible for:

 Preparing the Armed Forces and its personnel for military operations.
 Gathering military intelligence
 Organization and training of the Armed Forces
 Management of the logistic services

The Chief of the General Staff is also, Commander-in-Chief of the Armed Forces in the name of the President, in wartime.

Also, the General Staff is in command of the Special Forces, which is not aligned to any force command within the TAF. The Special Forces get their orders directly from the General Staff of the Turkish Armed Forces.

Land Forces 

The Turkish Land Forces, or Turkish Army, can trace its origins in the remnants of Ottoman forces during the fall of the Ottoman Empire at the end of World War I. When Mustafa Kemal Atatürk and his colleagues formed the Grand National Assembly (GNA) in Ankara on 23 April 1920, the XV Corps under the command of Kâzım Karabekir was the only corps which had any combat value. On 8 November 1920, the GNA decided to establish a standing army (Düzenli ordu) instead of irregular troops (the Kuva-yi Milliye, Kuva-yi Seyyare, etc.). GNA gorvernment's army won the Turkish War of Independence in 1922.

Naval Forces 

The Turkish Naval Forces, or Turkish Navy, constitutes the naval warfare service branch of the Turkish Armed Forces. The Turkish Navy maintains several Marines and Special Operations units. The Amphibious Marines Brigade (Amfibi Deniz Piyade Tugayı) based in Foça near İzmir consists of 4,500 men, three amphibious battalions, an MBT battalion, an artillery battalion, a support battalion and other company-sized units. The Su Altı Taarruz (S.A.T. – Underwater Attack) is dedicated to missions including the acquisition of military intelligence, amphibious assault, counter-terrorism and VIP protection; while the Su Altı Savunma (S.A.S. – Underwater Defense) is dedicated to coastal defense operations (such as clearing mines or unexploded torpedoes) and disabling enemy vessels or weapons with underwater operations; as well as counter-terrorism and VIP protection missions.

Air Force 

The Turkish Air Force is the aerial warfare service branch of the Turkish Armed Forces. It is primarily responsible for the protection and sovereignty of Turkish airspace but also provides air-power to the other service branches. Turkey is one of five NATO member states which are part of the nuclear sharing policy of the alliance, together with Belgium, Germany, Italy, and the Netherlands. A total of 90 B61 nuclear bombs are hosted at the Incirlik Air Base, 40 of which are allocated for use by the Turkish Air Force in case of a nuclear conflict, but their use requires the approval of NATO.

The Air Force took part in the Operation Deliberate Force of 1995 and Operation Allied Force of 1999, and later participated in the United Nations peacekeeping mission in Bosnia-Herzegovina, employing two squadrons (one in the Ghedi fighter wing, and after 2000 one in the Aviano fighter wing.) They returned to Turkey in 2001. In 2006, 4 Turkish F-16 fighter jets were deployed for NATO's Baltic Air Policing operation.

Military bases and soldiers stationed abroad

As of February 2021, Turkey has at least over 60,000+  military personnel stationed outside its territory. The only military base stationed permanently abroad, regardless of the organizations that are members of Turkey, which has been temporarily holding troops several times abroad due to its responsibilities arising from many international political members, particularly NATO membership, is the Cyprus Turkish Peace Force Command. The military bases of the Turkish Armed Forces in Qatar, Syria, Somalia and Bashiqa, among an unknown amount of other bases internationally, are currently active. It was announced in 2017 that Turkey would start working on establishing a research base in Antarctica.

According to a study conducted in England, Turkey has the largest deployment of international troops after the United States, with an estimated strength of at least 60,000+ military personnel stationed outside of the borders of Turkey. This means that 1 in 6 of the active military troops of Turkey (which is estimated to be 355,200 in 2020) are deployed outside of the borders of the country.

The Republic of Turkey currently has a military presence in 14 countries spanning 3 continents;

  – 24 troops in Pasha Liman Base, with 2 frigates. An Albanian-Turkish military cooperation agreement was signed in 1992 that encompassed rebuilding Albania's Pasha Liman Base by Turkey alongside granted access for Turkish use.
  – Buildings and structures in Gizil Sherg military town, and one terminal building located in the airfield in Hacı Zeynalabdin settlement. An observation base was also built by Turkey in the Nagorno-Karabakh region after the 44-day 2020 Nagorno-Karabakh war. The base was established in Aghdam under the name "Ceasefire Observation Center", and officially started to operate in January 2021 with 60 Turkish and Russian soldiers stationed at the base.
  – Under EUROFOR Operation Althea 242 troops, previously under Implementation Force and Stabilisation Force in Bosnia and Herzegovina.
  – Turkey has signed agreement with Iraq which includes allowing the Turkish army to pursue elements of the Kurdistan Workers' Party (PKK) in northern Iraq, with the permission of, and in coordination with the Federal Government of Iraq. It also includes opening two liaison offices between Baghdad and Ankara to exchange intelligence and security information between the two countries. As of 2020, Turkey has a military base with 2,000 personnel in Bashiqa and Bamarni Air Base garrisoned with around 60 tanks, Armoured personnel carriers and one commando battalion. Turkey has more than 40+ military and intelligence bases scattered all around Iraq, the most out of any country. There are plans to build a new base in the Metina area of Duhok governorate in Iraqi Kurdistan Region as of April 2021. In total, Turkey has stationed around 5,000 to 10,000 soldiers in Iraq.
  – 152 units for MONUSCO mission.
  – An estimated 321 troops serve in the Kosovo Security Battalion command. They are stationed at Sultan Murat base in the city of Prizren for UNMIK mission and KFOR peacekeeping force's.
  – 100 Personnel for UNIFIL mission and Maritime Task Force (MTF) participant units.
  – Airbases at al-Watiya, Mitiga and Misrata, in addition to Zwara. The amount of Turkish soldiers stationed in Libya is unknown.
  – A total of 35,000 to 40,000 armed forces of the Republic of Turkey are currently in active duty Cyprus Turkish Peace Force Command.
  – A military base in Doha with 5,000 personnel.
  – Camp TURKSOM with 2,000 personnel.
  – Bases in Al-Bab, Al-Rai, Akhtarin, Afrin, Jindires, Rajo and Jarablus with at least 5,000 personnel in Euphrates Shield and Olive Branch regions. New bases were followed at south of Afrin canton in Atme and Darat Izza There are 114 Turkish bases in Syria as of January 2022. After operation Peace Spring, approximately 6,400 personnel are working around the Peace Spring region between Ras al-Ayn and Tell Abyad. 19 observation points are settled around Idlib and Aleppo Province. Altogether, there are an estimated 10,500 Turkish soldiers and 250 tanks stationed in Syria. These numbers are constantly subject to modifications.
 – 50 Turkish soldiers are stationed in the CAR as part of the UN Multidimensional Integrated Stabilization Mission (MINUSCA).
 – 50 Turkish soldiers are serving in Mali as part of the UN Multidimensional Integrated Stabilization Mission (MINUSMA).
 – Suakin was allocated to Turkey for 99 years after an agreement with Sudan in December 2017. Many claim that Turkey is planning to militarize the port city due to its geostrategic significance in the Red Sea, which has strained Turkey's and Sudan's relationship with Egypt severely. There has, however, been no development regarding a military base within the city as of July 2022.

Role of the military in Turkish politics

After the Republic of Turkey was founded in 1923, Mustafa Kemal Atatürk prohibited the political activities of officers in active service with the Military Penal Code numbered 1632 and dated 22 May 1930 (Askeri Ceza Kanunu). However, after the coups d'état in 1960, the Millî Birlik Komitesi (National Unity Committee) established the Inner Service Act of the Turkish Armed Forces (Türk Silahlı Kuvvetleri İç Hizmet Kanunu) on 4 January 1961 to legitimize their military interventions in politics. In subsequent coups d'état and coup d'état attempts, they showed reasons to justify their political activities especially with the article 35 and 85 of this act.

The Turkish military perceived itself as the guardian of Kemalist ideology, the official state ideology, especially of the secular aspects of Kemalism. The TAF still maintains an important degree of influence over the decision-making process regarding issues related to Turkish national security, albeit decreased in the past decades, via the National Security Council.

The military had a record of intervening in politics, removing elected governments four times in the past. Indeed, it assumed power for several periods in the latter half of the 20th century. It executed three coups d'état: in 1960 (27 May coup), in 1971 (12 March coup), and in 1980 (12 September coup). Following the 1960 coup d'état, the military executed the first democratically elected prime minister in Turkey, Adnan Menderes, in 1961. Most recently, it maneuvered the removal of an Islamist prime minister, Necmettin Erbakan, in 1997 (known as the 28 February memorandum). Contrary to outsider expectations, the Turkish populace was not uniformly averse to coups; many welcomed the ejection of governments they perceived as unconstitutional.

On 27 April 2007, in advance of the 4 November 2007 presidential election, and in reaction to the politics of Abdullah Gül, who has a past record of involvement in Islamist political movements and banned Islamist parties such as the Welfare Party, the army issued a statement of its interests. It said that the army is a party to "arguments" regarding secularism; that Islamism ran counter to the secular nature of Turkey, and to the legacy of Mustafa Kemal Atatürk. The Army's statement ended with a clear warning that the TAF stood ready to intervene if the secular nature of the Turkish Constitution is compromised, stating that "the Turkish Armed Forces maintain their sound determination to carry out their duties stemming from laws to protect the unchangeable characteristics of the Republic of Turkey. Their loyalty to this determination is absolute."

Over a hundred people, including several generals, have been detained or questioned since July 2008 with respect to the so-called organisation Ergenekon, an alleged clandestine, ultra-nationalist organization with ties to members of the country's military and security forces. The group is accused of terrorism in Turkey. These accusing claims are reported, even while the trials are going on, mostly in the counter-secular and Islamist media organs.

On 22 February 2010 more than 40 officers were arrested and then formally charged with attempting to overthrow the government with respect to the so-called "Sledgehammer" plot. They include four admirals, a general and two colonels, some of them retired, including former commanders of the Turkish navy and air force (three days later, the former commanders of the navy and air force were released). Partially as a result, the Washington Post reported in April 2010 that the military's power had decreased.

On the eve of the Supreme Military Council of August 2011, the Chief of the General Staff, along with the Army, Navy, and Air Force commanders, requested their retirement, in protest of the mass arrests which they perceived as a deliberate and planned attack against the Kemalist and secular-minded officers of the Turkish Armed Forces by the Islamists in Turkey, who began to control key positions in the Turkish government, judiciary and police. The swift replacement of the force commanders in the Supreme Military Council meeting affirmed the government's control over the appointment of top-level commanders. However, promotions continue to be determined by the General Staff with limited civilian control. The European Commission, in its 2011 regular yearly report on Turkey's progress towards EU accession, stated that "further reforms on the composition and powers of the Supreme Military Council, particularly on the legal basis of promotions, still need to materialise." The service branch commanders continue to report to the Prime Minister instead of the Defence Minister.
 
In July 2016, parts of the Turkish Armed Forces attempted to take over the government, but Erdogan supporters and other loyal military units stopped the coup attempt. Many people died and hundreds were injured. The parliament house and some other buildings in Ankara and Istanbul were damaged. Thousands of military personnel have been arrested and the structure of the armed forces has been overhauled.

Medals and awards
 Turkish Armed Forces Medal of Honor
 Turkish Armed Forces Medal of Distinguished Service
 Turkish Armed Forces Medal of Distinguished Courage and Self-Sacrifice
 Turkish Armed Forces Medal of Bravery and Valour
 Turkish Armed Forces State Medal of Honor

See also

 Conscription in Turkey
 List of Chiefs of the Turkish General Staff
 Military equipment of Turkey
 2016 Turkish coup d'état attempt
 Gendarmerie General Command (Turkey)
 Coast Guard Command (Turkey)
 Village guard system
 Defense industry of Turkey
 List of countries by military expenditures
 List of countries by number of military and paramilitary personnel

Notes

References

Bibliography 
 

Gareth Jenkins, 'Power and unaccountability in the Turkish security forces,' Conflict, Security, and Development, Volume 1, Issue 1.

External links

 Turkish Armed Forces (English)
 Bosphorus Naval News (turkishnavy.net)